William Watson (born 4 December 1949) is a Scottish former footballer, who played as a defender.

Watson signed with Manchester United in 1970. He played sparingly for United, going on loan to the Miami Toros of the North American Soccer League in 1973. After returning to England, Watson made a free transfer to Motherwell. In 1978, Watson moved to Dundee for two seasons. In 1980, he moved to the United States and signed with the Phoenix Inferno of the Major Indoor Soccer League. He spent four seasons with Phoenix. In the last season, the team was renamed the Phoenix Pride because the new Mormon ownership objected to the reference to hell.

References

External links
MUFCInfo.com profile

NASL/MISL stats

1949 births
Living people
Footballers from North Lanarkshire
Association football defenders
Scottish footballers
Scottish expatriate footballers
Scottish Football League players
English Football League players
Dundee F.C. players
Major Indoor Soccer League (1978–1992) players
Manchester United F.C. players
Miami Toros players
Motherwell F.C. players
North American Soccer League (1968–1984) players
Phoenix Inferno players
Expatriate soccer players in the United States
Scottish expatriate sportspeople in the United States